Zeraq (also Romanized as Zarraq and Zaraq; also known as Zar, Zaragh, Zāreh, and Zarreh) is a village in Mofatteh Rural District, in the Central District of Famenin County, Hamadan Province, Iran. At the 2006 census, its population was 205, in 38 families.

References 

Populated places in Famenin County